General elections were held in Malaysia between Saturday, 8 July and Saturday, 22 July 1978. Voting took place in all 154 parliamentary constituencies of Malaysia, each electing one Member of Parliament to the Dewan Rakyat, the dominant house of Parliament. State elections also took place in 276 state constituencies (except Kelantan, Sabah and Sarawak) on the same day.

It was Hussein Onn's first and only election since he became the country's third Prime Minister in 1976. His Barisan Nasional Party emerged victorious with 131 of the 154 seats in Parliament. Voter turnout was 75.3%.

Results
As expected, Barisan Nasional comfortably maintained its majority in the Malaysian Parliament and thus, gave the Prime Minister the power to form a government with a free hand. Despite the victory, BN actually lost four seats out of 154 seats to the opposition.

The Pan-Malaysian Islamic Party (PAS) withdrew from BN in the midst of the 1977 Kelantan Emergency over disagreements with UMNO over the running of the state government of Kelantan, which PAS had controlled since the first post-independence general election in 1959. With the support of UMNO, detractors within PAS split with the party and formed the Pan-Malaysian Islamic Front (BERJASA). In the election, PAS lost the control of the state for the first time to the UMNO-BERJASA alliance within BN. Tengku Razaleigh Hamzah has been credited for UMNO's victory in Kelantan.

The opposition garnered 42.8% of total votes. In spite of that, the opposition as one won only 23 seats. Democratic Action Party won the largest slice of the pie among the opposition parties and hence, its leader Lim Kit Siang retained his position as the leader of the opposition that he had obtained four years earlier.

Candidates were returned unopposed in nine constituencies. The registered electors from these constituencies therefore did not cast ballots.

By state

Johore

Kedah

Kelantan

Kuala Lumpur

Malacca

Negri Sembilan

Pahang

Penang

Perak

Perlis

Sabah

Sarawak

Selangor

Trengganu

See also
1978 Malaysian state elections

References

General elections in Malaysia
Malaysia
General